Dag Palovič (born 4 January 1975, in Bratislava) is a Slovak writer, former professional poker player, businessman, radio speaker and TV moderator. Since 1 January 2011 until 31 December 2013, he was a member of PokerStars Team Pro, first and as of February 2018 only sponsored poker player from Slovakia. He is best known for making two European Poker Tour (EPT) final tables. As of March 2013, he is second leading Slovak all time money list with career earnings of $909,405 and is also an author of first Slovak poker book on poker titled  "Ako sa stať poker pro" (How to become a poker pro), co-authored by 1983 World Series of Poker champion Tom McEvoy. From 2000 until 2004 he was CEO and Chairman Of The Board of Directors of "ad pepper media Slovakia, a.s.", the daughter company of one of the world´s leading e-Adverising german-dutch agency "ad pepper media International N.V." for Slovakia and Czechia. In 2013 he published a crime novel Twodollars Crimson Bill. In spring 2018 he will publish hus first and very unique selftransformation book EYE OPENER, (subtitle SURVIVAL’s GUIDE ABOUT Women Men Sex Health Food Emotions Psychology Happiness Spirituality and LIFE FOR EVERYONE) with a cooperation with 15 experts from all around the world (incl. a few professors, few doctors, etc.)

Poker career
Palovič first became notable in late 2007 by making a final table at €4,700 EPT Prague Main Event, being first Slovak player to do so. Palovič was eliminated in 7th place winning $137,151. He repeated this success five months later with his second final table appearance, this time at main event of EPT San Remo with another 7th-place finish, this time taking home $176,628. Since then, Palovič cashed at the EPT three time, including a 14th place in EPT Grand Final held in Madrid in May 2011, for which he earned $89,054.

In summer 2008 Palovič also made his first in the money finish at the World Series of Poker, finishing 69th in $5,000 No Limit Hold'em event. Next year, Palovič added three more cashes with one of them being his 120th place at the 2009 WSOP Main Event, being the first and as of October 2010 only player from Slovakia to cash in this tournament. He managed to break his own record a year later with a 37th-place finish and prize of $206,395.

As of October 2012, Palovič's 5 cashes at the WSOP account for $268,826 of his $909,405 career winnings.

Outside of EPT and WSOP he is also known for winning €5,000 Internationaux de France de Heads Up in March 2010 with a first prize of $84,570 as well as being author of book "Ako sa stať poker pro" co-authored by Tom McEvoy.

Other activities 
Before poker, Palovič was known mostly as a TV personality, being host of several TV shows as well as playing a few roles in Slovak movies in mid-80s. As a host of music programmes during 1996 - 2004 he has done interviews with celebrities such as Lauryn Hill, Jamiroquai, Wyclef Jean, Lenny Kravitz, Kate Ryan or Tiziano Ferro.

He is also a successful businessman and a member of Mensa.

Personal life 
Palovič is currently single with no children. During 2006 - 2009 he was engaged to Slovak top model Zuzana Gregorová.

Notes

External links
PokerNewsDaily profile
Hendon Mob tournament results
PokerPortal.sk interview
Palovič vs Dario Minieri at EPT San Remo
VIDEO Charity Event with Dag Palovič

1975 births
Living people
Slovak poker players
Mensans
Slovak television presenters